The Columbia Journalism Review (CJR) is a biannual magazine for professional journalists that has been published by the Columbia University Graduate School of Journalism since 1961. Its contents include news and media industry trends, analysis, professional ethics, and stories behind news.

In October 2015, it was announced that the publishing frequency of the print magazine was being reduced from six to two issues per year in order to focus on digital operations.

Organization board 
The current chairman is Stephen J. Adler, who also serves as editor in chief for Reuters.

The previous chairman of the magazine was Victor Navasky, a professor at the Columbia University Graduate School of Journalism and former editor and publisher of the politically progressive The Nation. According to Executive Editor Michael Hoyt, Navasky's role is "99% financial" and "he doesn't push anything editorially." Hoyt also has stated that Navasky has "learned how to get a small magazine of ideas into the black, and he's trying to come up with some strategies for us."

Finances 
CJR is a nonprofit entity and relies on fundraising to fund its operations. Donors to CJR include George Soros' Open Society Foundations.

In August 2007, Mike Hoyt, the executive editor of CJR since 2003, said the magazine's income in 2007 would exceed expenses by about $50,000, with estimates of a $40,000 surplus in 2008. Hoyt attributed the surpluses to a mix of some staff cuts, such as not replacing three editors who left, and fundraising increases. Donations to the CJR in the past three years have included about $1.25 million from a group of news veterans headed by former Philadelphia Inquirer executive editor Eugene Roberts.

As of mid-2007, the CJR had an eight-person staff, an annual budget of $2.3 million, and a paper circulation of approximately 19,000, including 6,000 student subscriptions. Subscriptions to an Internet newsletter entitled The Media Today have begun, but as of 2017, enrollment numbers are not available and do not contribute to these circulation figures.

Editor 
In 2016, Kyle Pope, who had served as the editor in chief of The New York Observer, was announced as the new editor and publisher of CJR, replacing Liz Spayd, when she was announced as the sixth public editor of The New York Times. On July 24, 2017 in Washington D.C., Pope addressed the House Judiciary Committee bipartisan Forum on Press Freedoms regarding concerns that the actions of Donald Trump during his campaign for and following election as President of the United States  undermine the constitutional freedom of the press.

See also 
American Journalism Review

References

External links
 

Biannual magazines published in the United States
Columbia University Graduate School of Journalism
Columbia University academic journals
Journalism reviews
Magazines established in 1961
Magazines published in New York City
Magazines about the media
Professional and trade magazines